Volmar Wikström (27 December 1889 – 10 June 1957) was a Finnish wrestler from Pargas, Olympic medalist in freestyle wrestling.

Wikström competed in Greco-Roman wrestling at the 1912 Summer Olympics in Stockholm where he won the first four matches but was eliminated in the sixth round.
 
At the 1924 Summer Olympics in Paris he competed in freestyle wrestling, and received a silver medal in lightweight.

References

External links
 

1889 births
1957 deaths
People from Pargas
Swedish-speaking Finns
Olympic wrestlers of Finland
Wrestlers at the 1912 Summer Olympics
Wrestlers at the 1924 Summer Olympics
Finnish male sport wrestlers
Olympic silver medalists for Finland
Olympic medalists in wrestling
Medalists at the 1924 Summer Olympics
Sportspeople from Southwest Finland
19th-century Finnish people
20th-century Finnish people